Chris Edmonds (born January 1, 1978) is a former end and  fullback in the National Football League. He played for the Cincinnati Bengals in 2002 and 2003. He signed as an undrafted free agent after the 2001 NFL Draft after playing at the college level at West Virginia. In 2004, he played for the Frankfurt Galaxy in NFL Europe. He is a member of Omega Psi Phi fraternity.

References

External links
NFL.com Profile
Just Sports Stats

1978 births
Living people
West Virginia Mountaineers football players
American football fullbacks
Cincinnati Bengals players
Frankfurt Galaxy players
Players of American football from Newark, New Jersey
African-American players of American football
21st-century African-American sportspeople
20th-century African-American sportspeople